J. O. Morgan (born 1978) is an author from Edinburgh, Scotland. The latest of his seven volumes of verse, The Martian's Regress, is set in the far future, when humans "lose their humanity." He has also published two novels: Pupa (2021) and Appliance (2022).

Works
Each of Morgan's seven poetry volumes is a single book-length work. His fifth, Interference Pattern, was shortlisted for the T. S. Eliot Prize and his first, Natural Mechanical, won the Aldeburgh Poetry Prize in 2009.

The third work, At Maldon (2014), revisits the Old English epic Battle of Maldon, detailing events that took place on the Essex coast in 991 CE. A recording of Morgan reading it was made for the Poetry Archive on 27 May 2014. He has recited the whole work from memory on several occasions.

Royal Air Force involvement in maintaining the Airborne Nuclear Deterrent in the early Cold War period forms the basis for Morgan's sixth publication, Assurances (2018). It was shortlisted for the Forward Prize and won the Costa Poetry Award, when the judges praised it as "original, compelling, ambitious, highly accomplished and marvellously sustained".

Morgan's most recent volume of poetry, The Martian's Regress (2020), is set in the far future. It considers "what humans become when they lose their humanity," and explores "what a fragile environment eventually makes of those who persist in tampering with it."

Publications
Appliance (Jonathan Cape, 2022) ISBN 978 1 7873338 8 8
Pupa (Henningham Family Press, 2021) 
The Martian's Regress (Jonathan Cape, 2020) 
Assurances (Jonathan Cape, 2018) 
Interference Pattern (Jonathan Cape, 2016) 
In Casting Off (HappenStance Press, 2015) 
At Maldon (CB editions, 2013) 
Long Cuts (CB editions, 2011) 
Natural Mechanical (CB editions 2009)

Awards and recognition
2022 – Orwell Prize for Political Fiction (finalist)  – Appliance 
2020 – T. S. Eliot Prize for Poetry (shortlist) – The Martian's Regress
2018 – Costa Poetry Award (won) – Assurances
2018 – Forward Poetry Prize for Best Collection (shortlist) – Assurances
2016 – T. S. Eliot Prize for Poetry (shortlist) – Interference Pattern
2016 – Saltire Society Poetry Award (shortlist) – Interference Pattern
2016 – Poetry Book Society Recommendation – Interference Pattern
2014 – Saltire Society Poetry Award (shortlist) – At Maldon
2012 – Scottish Poetry Book Award (shortlist) – Long Cuts
2010 – Scottish Poetry Book Award (shortlist) – Natural Mechanical
2009 – Aldeburgh Poetry Prize (won) – Natural Mechanical
2009 – Forward Poetry Prize for First Collection (shortlist) – Natural Mechanical
2009 – Poetry Book Society Recommendation – Natural Mechanical

References

External links

Helena Nelson of HappenStance Press on At Maldon
J. O. Morgan reads from Interference Pattern Royal Festival Hall (15 Jan 2017) 
Beth McDonough on Interference Pattern in Dundee University Review of the Arts
Forward Arts Foundation interview with J. O. Morgan

1978 births
Living people
21st-century Scottish poets
21st-century British male writers
Scottish male poets
Writers from Edinburgh
Costa Book Award winners